In heraldry, a fess or fesse (from Middle English , Old French , and Latin , "band") is a charge on a coat of arms (or flag) that takes the form of a band running horizontally across the centre of the shield.  Writers disagree in how much of the shield's surface is to be covered by a fess or other ordinary, ranging from one-fifth to one-third.  The Oxford Guide to Heraldry states that earlier writers including Leigh, Holme, and Guillim favour one-third, while later writers such as Edmondson favour one-fifth "on the grounds that a bend, pale, or chevron occupying one-third of the field makes the coat look clumsy and disagreeable."  A fess is likely to be shown narrower if it is uncharged, that is, if it does not have other charges placed on it, and/or if it is to be shown with charges above and below it; and shown wider if charged. The fess or bar, termed  in French heraldry, should not be confused with fasces.

Gallery

Diminutives
In English heraldry, two or more such charges appearing together on a shield are termed bars, though there are no definitive rules setting the width of the fess, the bar, nor their comparative width.  A shield of (often six or eight) horizontal stripes of alternating colour is called barry.  Narrower versions of the bar are called barrulets ("little bars"), and when a shield of horizontal stripes alternating colour is composed of ten or more stripes, it is called barruly or burely instead of barry.  A cotise, defined as half the width of a barrulet, may be borne alongside a fess, and often two of these appear, one on either side of the fess.  This is often termed "a fess cotised" (also cottised, coticed or cotticed).  Another diminutive of the fess called a closet is said to be between a bar and barrulet, but this is seldom found.

Other uses

A shield party per fess (or simply per fess) is divided in half horizontally (in the manner of a fess).  A charge placed horizontally may be termed fesswise or fessways, and two or more charges arranged in a horizontal row are blazoned in fess or in bar.

Notable and unusual forms
A mural fess, that is a fess embattled and masoned of the field, can be seen in the arms of Suzanne Elizabeth Altvater.

The arms of Rennie Fritchie, Baroness Fritchie provide an example of three Barrulets fracted and there conjoined to a Chevronel.

A flag which has a central horizontal stripe that is half the height of the flag is sometimes said to have a Spanish fess. The name is based on the most well-known example of this style of flag, the flag of Spain.

See also
 Bar (heraldry)

Notes

Further reading

 Boutell, Charles (1890). Heraldry, Ancient and Modern: Including Boutell's Heraldry. London: Frederick Warne. 
 Fox-Davies, Arthur Charles (1909). A Complete Guide to Heraldry. New York: Dodge Pub. Co. . 
 Neubecker, Ottfried (1976). Heraldry: Sources, Symbols and Meaning. Maidenhead, England: McGraw-Hill. .
 Volborth, Carl-Alexander von (1981). Heraldry: Customs, Rules and Styles. Poole, England: Blandford Press. . 
 Woodcock, Thomas and John Martin Robinson (1988). The Oxford Guide to Heraldry. Oxford: University Press. . 
 Woodward, John and George Burnett (1892). Woodward's a treatise on heraldry, British and foreign. Edinburgh: W. & A. K. Johnson. . 

Heraldic ordinaries